Joseph Bernard Kruskal, Jr. (January 29, 1928 – September 19, 2010) was an American mathematician, statistician, computer scientist and psychometrician.

Personal life 
Kruskal was born to a Jewish family in New York City to a successful fur wholesaler, Joseph B. Kruskal, Sr. His mother, Lillian Rose Vorhaus Kruskal Oppenheimer, became a noted promoter of origami during the early era of television.

Kruskal had two notable brothers, Martin David Kruskal, co-inventor of solitons, and William Kruskal, who developed the Kruskal–Wallis one-way analysis of variance. One of Joseph Kruskal's nephews is notable computer scientist and professor Clyde Kruskal.

Education and career 
He was a student at the University of Chicago earning a bachelor of science in mathematics in the year of 1948, and a master of science in mathematics in the following year 1949. After his time at the University of Chicago Kruskal attended Princeton University, where he completed his Ph.D. in 1954, nominally under Albert W. Tucker and Roger Lyndon, but de facto under Paul Erdős with whom he had two very short conversations. Kruskal worked on well-quasi-orderings  and multidimensional scaling.
He was a Fellow of the American Statistical Association, former president of the Psychometric Society, and former president of the Classification Society of North America. He also initiated and was first president of the Fair Housing Council of South Orange and Maplewood in 1963, and actively supported civil rights in several other organizations such as CORE.

He worked at Bell Labs from 1959 to 1993.

Research 
In statistics, Kruskal's most influential work is his seminal contribution to the formulation of multidimensional scaling. In computer science, his best known work is Kruskal's algorithm for computing the minimal spanning tree (MST) of a weighted graph. The algorithm first orders the edges by weight and then proceeds through the ordered list adding an edge to the partial MST provided that adding the new edge does not create a cycle. Minimal spanning trees have applications to the construction and pricing of communication networks.  In combinatorics, he is known for Kruskal's tree theorem (1960), which is also interesting from a mathematical logic perspective since it can only be proved nonconstructively.   Kruskal also applied his work in linguistics, in an experimental lexicostatistical study of Indo-European languages, together with the linguists Isidore Dyen and Paul Black.  Their database is still widely used.

Concepts named after Joseph Kruskal
 Kruskal's algorithm (1956)
 Kruskal's tree theorem (1960)
 Kruskal–Katona theorem (1963)
 Kruskal rank or k-rank (1977), closely related to the spark

References

External links

The Dyen, Kruskal and Black lexicostatistical database :  the 200-meaning Swadesh lists for 95 Indo-European languages.
 MacTutor biography of Joseph Kruskal

20th-century American mathematicians
21st-century American mathematicians
Jewish American scientists
American statisticians
University of Chicago alumni
Princeton University alumni
Scientists at Bell Labs
1928 births
2010 deaths
Fellows of the American Statistical Association
Scientists from New York City
Mathematicians from New York (state)
Combinatorialists
21st-century American Jews
University of Michigan faculty
People from New York City